The 2018 SBS Drama Awards, presented by Seoul Broadcasting System (SBS), took place on December 31, 2018 at SBS Prism Tower, Sangam-dong, Mapo-gu, Seoul. It was hosted by Shin Dong-yup, Shin Hye-sun, and Lee Je-hoon.

Winners and nominees

Presenters

Special performances

See also
2018 KBS Drama Awards
2018 MBC Drama Awards

References

 
 https://www.koreandrama.org/2018-sbs-drama-awards-winners-list/
 https://www.kpopmap.com/winners-of-2018-sbs-kbs-mbc-drama-awards/

External links
 

Seoul Broadcasting System original programming
2018 television awards
SBS Drama Awards
2018 in South Korea
December 2018 events in South Korea